Maronite Catholic Eparchy of Our Lady of the Martyrs of Lebanon in Mexico City (in Latin: Eparchy Dominae Nostrae Martyrum Libanensium in Civitate Mexicana Maronitarum) is an eparchy of the Maronite Church immediately subject to the Holy See in Mexico. In 2010 there were 160,000 members. Its current eparch is Georges Saad Abi Younes, OLM.

Territory and statistics
The eparchy has jurisdiction over the Maronite faithful of the whole Mexico. Its eparchial seat is Mexico City, where is located the Nuestra Señora de Valvanera Cathedral.

In Mexico Maronites are present in Puebla, Toluca, Pachuca, Torreon, Veracruz, Monterrey, Chihuahua, Mérida, Guadalajara, Veracruz, Coahuila and Mexico City. On November 6, 2010, the proto-parish devoted (being the first) to Saint Charbel in Chihuahua, was consecrated by the hands of Monsignor George Abi-Younes, Monsignor Constancio Miranda, Archbishop of Chihuahua, Monsignor Juan Guillermo Lopez, bishop of Cuauhtémoc-Madera and Bishop Gerardo Rojas Lopez, bishop of Nuevo Casas Grandes.

The territory is divided into seven parishes and in 2010 there were 160,000 Lebanese Maronite Catholics.

History
Since 1960's began to arrive in Mexico immigrants from Lebanon and temples where Masses were officiated were founded. In 1960 for the pastoral care of the faithful of the Maronite Church in Mexico City, arrived the first three Maronite priests: Antonio Abiyunes, Antonio Abou Sleiman and Jose Bustany. Due to the increasing number of Lebanese emigrants became necessary to form a new church structure of the Maronite Catholic Church in Mexico.

One of the initiatives to improve pastoral care of the Maronites was made by Eparchy Tayah in the translation of the Maronite Missal by its priests into Spanish, instructing the priest Alberto Meouchi to conduct a Missal and Lectionary for the altar and other prayer books for the faithful. Spanish, which along with the Arabic, is used in three parishes of the eparchy.

The eparchy was erected on 6 November 1995 with the papal bull Cum Christifideles by Pope John Paul II.

Other initiatives carried out by Eparch Tayah were to remodel the Church of Nuestra Señora de Valvanera, Mexico City, current Maronite Cathedral as well as the acquisition of the Episcopal residence.

Eparchs
 Pierre Wadih Tayah (November 6, 1995 - May 4, 2002)
 Georges Saad Abi Younes, OLM, (since 22 February 2003)

References

External links

 http://www.catholic-hierarchy.org/diocese/dmema.html
 https://web.archive.org/web/20160107083703/http://www.cem.org.mx/mod_directorio.php?c=EPA&
 https://web.archive.org/web/20080506191106/http://www.sancharbel.org.mx/, Official site of the Eparchy
 http://www.gcatholic.org/dioceses/diocese/nsma0.htm

Arab Mexican
Eastern Catholic dioceses in Mexico
Lebanese Mexican
Maronite Catholic eparchies
Mexico City